Justice Dr. Leslie Mervyn Jayaratne is a Sri Lankan lawyer, judge, author and the 2nd Governor of Southern Province.

Early life
Leslie Mervyn Jayaratne was born in Ahangama in the Southern Province. His primary schooling was at Ahangama Dharmarama School before attending Mahinda College in Galle and then St Peter's College, Colombo.

Legal career
In the 1950s he entered the Ceylon Law College, passing out as a Proctor and practising in Matara.  Jayaratne graduated from the University of London, with a Bachelor of Laws (LL.B), joining the Inner Temple, London and was called to the bar in 1969, returning to Sri Lanka later that year.

Jayaratne joined the Sri Lankan judiciary in 1971 as a Magistrate with his first posting in Negombo.

Governorship
After returning to Sri Lanka from a three-year tour of Fiji Jayaratne was appointed Governor of Southern Province on 31 December 1993 by the President Dingiri Banda Wijetunga, However, with the change of Government he lost that posting.

References

External links
Dr. Rohini Jayaratne & Dr. Mervin Jayaratne Online portfolio
Sri Lankan Provinces from 1988

Living people
Year of birth missing (living people)
Governors of Southern Province, Sri Lanka